Alessandro Tosi (born 28 April 2001) is a Sammarinese footballer who plays as a defender for Victor San Marino and the San Marino national team.

Career
Tosi made his international debut for San Marino on 21 September 2022 in a friendly match against Seychelles, which finished as a 0–0 home draw.

Career statistics

International

References

2001 births
Living people
Sammarinese footballers
San Marino youth international footballers
San Marino under-21 international footballers
San Marino international footballers
Association football defenders